The Gunter Baronetcy, of Wetherby Grange in the Parish of Collingham in the West Riding of the County of York, was a title in the Baronetage of the United Kingdom. It was created on 18 April 1901 for the officer and Conservative politician Robert Gunter. The title became extinct on the death of the third Baronet in 1980.

Gunter baronets, of Wetherby Grange (1901)
Sir Robert Gunter, 1st Baronet (1831–1905)
Sir Robert Benyon Nevill Gunter, 2nd Baronet (1871–1917)
Sir Ronald Vernon Gunter, 3rd Baronet (1904–1980)

Arms

References

Extinct baronetcies in the Baronetage of the United Kingdom
Gunter family